The New World is the seventh album by American singer/songwriter Bruce Robison. It was released on September 2, 2008 on Premium Records.

Track listing 
All songs (Robison) except where noted
 “The Hammer” - 2:30 	   	
 “Only” - 2:42 		
 “Bad Girl Blues” - 5:13 		
 “California 85” - 3:44 		
 “Larosse” - 4:16
 “The New One” (Robison, Marty Muse)- 2:35
 “Twistin'” - 3:33
 “Hanging On Hopeless” (Kevin McKinney)- 3:29
 “She Don't Care” - 2:24
 “Echo” - 5:32

Credits

Musicians 
 Kevin McKinney - Acoustic, bass, and Harmony Vocals on "Bad Girl Blues" & drums on "Hanging on Hopeless"
 Conrad Choucroun - drums, percussion
 George Reiff - bass, Harmony vocals
 Sweney Tidball - Keys
 Mickey Raphael - Harmonica
 Eleanor Whitmore - Fiddle, Harmony vocals
 Kelly Willis - Harmony vocals
 Pat Manske - drums on "She Don't Care"
 Rolf Sieker - Banjo
 Andrew Nafziger - Electric banjo, Electric guitar
 Chip Dolan - Keys
 Marty Muse - Pedal steel on "Twistin'" and "The New One"
 Lloyd Maines - Pedal steel on "California 85" & "Hanging on Hopeless"
 Judy Arnold, Dion Arnold, & Joy Moore - Harmony vocals on "Bad Girl Blues"
 Carlos Sosa, Fernie Castillo, Ralo Vallejo - Horns
 Paul English - snare drum on "Only"

Production 
 Produced by Bruce Robison
 Engineered by Andrew Hernandez
 Recorded at Premium Recording Service, Austin, Texas

Artwork 
 Art by Jim Franklin 
 Art Direction/Design by The Butler Bros.

Releases

External links 
 Bruce Robison website
 Premium Records website

References 

Bruce Robison albums
2008 albums